"Mr. Sun, Mr. Moon" is a song by the American rock band Paul Revere & the Raiders written by Mark Lindsay originally released as a single in 1969, then on the album Hard 'N' Heavy (with Marshmallow) later that year. The song peaked at number 18 on the Billboard Hot 100, number 15 on the Cash Box Top 100 Singles chart, and at number 8 on the RPM Top Singles chart.

The song was ranked by both Billboard and RPM as the number 95 song of 1969 on their year-end charts. The song was featured on the soundtrack album to Once Upon a Time in Hollywood.

Chart performance

Weekly charts

Year-end charts

References

American songs
Paul Revere & the Raiders songs
1969 songs
1969 singles
Columbia Records singles
Songs written by Mark Lindsay